Onchidiidae are a family of small, air-breathing sea (and land) slugs. They are shell-less marine (except for 2 species) pulmonate gastropod molluscs. Onchidiidae is the only family within the superfamily Onchidioidea.

These animals are quite unusual in that they are emphatically not opisthobranchs with gills, as are almost all of the sea slugs. Instead these creatures are pulmonates. They are more closely related to air-breathing land and freshwater snails and slugs than they are to most other sea snails and sea slugs.

This family has no subfamilies (according to the taxonomy of the Gastropoda by Bouchet & Rocroi, 2005).

143 species names were created within the Onchidiidae, but until recently few species could be identified. In the late 1920s Hoffmann revised the family (based on the descriptions), and classified the described species into genera. Labbé later continued the revision and named many new genera in his classification of onchidiid slugs. Labbé also made mistakes in describing the anatomy of some species, and the Onchidiidae was not revised again for over 80 years. The genus Onchidium was revised in 2016 based on natural history, comparative anatomy, and DNA sequences. This was followed by revisions of the other onchidiid genera, and the descriptions of onchidiid species in several new genera.

Anatomy 
Adult onchidiids lack a shell, although a shell and operculum is present at the larval stage.  The mantle cavity is reduced to the point of absence, correlating with a loss of gills, raphes, and other characters usually found in the mantle cavity.  The organism is completely detorted.

Slugs in this family make and use love darts made of chitin.

Genetics 
In this family, the number of haploid chromosomes lies between 16 and 20 (according to the values in this table).

Habitat
Most of the species in this family are marine and are found in the intertidal zone. Many species live on rocky coasts, while others live in mangrove forests which may be marine or brackish. Onchidium stuxbergi (as E. ajuthiae, synonym in literature) was previously considered to be a fresh water species, but the species is now recognized to be found in brackish water habitats.

Remarkably, some onchidiid species are completely terrestrial. Semperoncis montana (synonym in literature: Platevindex apoikistes and Semperella montana) and Platevindex ponsonbyi are the only known terrestrial species in the Onchidiidae. They live in high-elevation rainforests in Borneo and the Philippines.

Life habits
All these slugs breathe air. The marine ones breathe and move around and feed during low tide, when the water recedes and the slugs are exposed to the air.

Genera
Genera in the family Onchidiidae include:
Alionchis Goulding and Dayrat, 2018
Hoffmannola Strand, 1932
 Laspionchis Dayrat & Goulding, 2019
 Marmaronchis Dayrat & Goulding, 2018
Melayonchis Dayrat and Goulding, 2017
Onchidella Gray, 1850
Onchidina Semper, 1885
Onchidium Buchanan, 1800 - type genus
 Paromoionchis Dayrat & Goulding, 2019
Peronia Fleming, 1822
Peronina Plate, 1893
Platevindex Baker, 1938 
Semperoncis Starobogatov, 1976
Wallaconchis Goulding and Dayrat, 2018

Synonymized genera

Arctonchis  Dall, 1910: synonym of Onchidella J. E. Gray, 1850
Elophilus Labbé, 1935: synonym of Onchidium Buchanan, 1800
Eudrastus Gistel, 1848: synonym of Peronia Fleming, 1822
Labbella Starobogatov, 1976: synonym of Onchidium Buchanan, 1800
 Lessonia Labbé, 1934: synonym of  Peronia Fleming, 1822
Lessonina Starobogatov, 1976: synonym of Peronia Fleming, 1822
Occidentella Hoffmann, 1929: synonym of Onchidella J. E. Gray, 1850
 Oncidiella P. Fischer & Crosse, 1878: synonym of Onchidella J.E. Gray, 1850
Oncidina Plate, 1893: synonym of Onchidina Semper, 1882
Oncis Plate, 1893: synonym of Platevindex H. B. Baker, 1938
Paraoncidium Labbé, 1934: synonym of Onchidina Semper, 1882
Paraperonia Labbé, 1934: synonym of Peronia Fleming, 1822
Peronella Mörch, 1863: synonym of Onchidella J.E. Gray, 1850
Peroniella Starobogatov, 1976 : synonym of Onchidella J. E. Gray, 1850
Quoya Labbé, 1934: synonym of Peronia J. Fleming, 1822
Quoyella Starobogatov, 1976: Peronia J. Fleming, 1822
Scaphis Labbé, 1934: synonym of Peronia J. Fleming, 1822
Semperella Labbé, 1934 synonym of Semperoncis Starobogatov, 1976
 Watsoniella Hoffmann, 1928: synonym of Hoffmannola Strand, 1932

References

External links

 
Taxa named by Constantine Samuel Rafinesque